Akbar is both a given name and a surname. Notable people with the name include:

People with the given name Akbar 
 Akbar (1542–1605), the third Mughal Emperor.
 Akbar II (1760–1837), second-to-last of the Mughal emperors of India
  Akbar Ali (born 2001), Bangladeshi cricketer who won 2020 Under-19 Cricket World Cup for Bangladesh national under-19 cricket team under his captaincy
 Akbar Hashemi Rafsanjani (born 1934), Iranian politician and fourth president of Iran
 Akbar Khan (1816–1846), Emir of Afghanistan (1842–1845)
 Akbar Khan (disability activist) (born 1962), recipient of India's National Award in 1989
 Akbar Khan (disambiguation), other people named Akbar Khan
 Ali Akbar Moinfar, Iranian politician
 Akbar Salubiro, a man who had gone missing in 2017 in Sulawesi, Indonesia, and his remains were found two days later inside the body of a Reticulated python

People with the surname Akbar 
 Harris Akbar, English boxer
 Hasan Akbar (born 1971), US soldier convicted of the murder of two officers
 Rada Akbar (born 1988), Afghan-born visual artist, and photographer
 Showat Akbar, one of the ringleaders of the murder of Richard Everitt
 Skandor Akbar (1934–2010), ring name of American professional wrestler and manager Jimmy Wehba
 Wahab Akbar (1960–2007), Filipino politician
 al-Shaykh al-Akbar, title of Ibn 'Arabi

Fictional characters 
 One of the comic-strip duo Akbar and Jeff of Life in Hell
 Admiral Ackbar, Star Wars character

See also
 Akbar (disambiguation)

Pakistani masculine given names
Urdu-language surnames